Raphaël Millet is a French writer, critic, producer and director of cinema and television, as well as an organiser and programmer of photographic and cultural events.

Studies 
Having completed his secondary education at lycée Henri-IV in Paris, Raphaël Millet graduated from the Paris Institut d'études politiques de Paris (Sciences Po) in 1994, obtained a master's degree (diplôme d'études approfondies – DEA) in political science (with a specialization in African studies) from University of Paris 1 Pantheon-Sorbonne in 1995, and a master's degree (diplôme d'études approfondies – DEA) in film studies from University of Paris III: Sorbonne Nouvelle in 1996.

Career 

Raphaël Millet started his career in 1996–97 as a consultant for the Paris office of international law firm Shearman & Sterling, then for the Organisation internationale de la Francophonie. In 1998, he joined French National Center of Cinematography and the moving image, as advisor to the CEO. In 1999, he joined French public national television broadcaster France Télévisions, as advisor to the CEO. In 2000, he became counselor for culture, cinema, television and new media, attached to the Minister of Overseas France, Christian Paul. Simultaneously, from 1997 to 2002, he taught film studies at La Sorbonne University.

In 2002, Raphaël Millet joined the French Ministry of Foreign Affairs. From 2002 to 2006, he was posted as Cultural attaché in the Singapore, where he supervised the programming of the annual French Film Festival, and where he organised the outdoor exhibition Earth from Above (La Terre vue du ciel) by Yann Arthus-Bertrand on Orchard Road. In 2005, he curated Screen Singapore, with Shirlene Noordin, to celebrate the heritage of Singaporean cinema from pre-independence days to the present, on the occasion of the 40th anniversary of the independence of Singapore. From 2006 to 2008, he was posted in Dubai as Regional Audiovisual attaché for the Middle East.

In 2007, he founded with Olivier Bohler a production company called Nocturnes Productions which became active from 2008 onwards. There, he served as executive producer on feature documentaries Code Name Melville (2008), Jean-Luc Godard / Disorder Exposed (2012), Edgar Morin, Chronicle of a Gaze (2014), as well as director on feature documentaries such as Pierre Schoendoerffer, the Sentinel of Memory (2011), The Cinematographic Voyage of Gaston Méliès to Tahiti (2014), Gaston Méliès and his Wandering Star Film Company (2015), Chaplin in Bali (2017), and The Voyages of Matisse - Chasing Light (2020).

From 2009 onwards, while retaining his production activities, Raphaël Millet joined as a partner Singapore-based creative communications company Phish Communications, where he helped program the Month of Photography Asia and develop public relations in the arts and culture for clients such as the Peranakan Museum and Art Stage Singapore.

Since 1995, Raphaël Millet has also kept on writing articles (for magazines such as Qantara, Cinémathèque, Positif, Trafic, Atlas des Cahiers du cinéma, Simulacres and BiblioAsia, as well as for festival catalogues), together with books generally about cinema (with a specialization both in Middle Eastern and Asian cinemas). He has also published a collection of unrhymed tercet poems about melancholy loosely influenced by both Celt tercets and Japanese haikus.

Publications

Books 
 Cinema in Lebanon / Le Liban au cinéma, Beirut, Rawiya Editions, 2017, 464 p. 
 Singapore Cinema, Singapore, Editions Didier Millet, 2006, 160 p. 
 Petites mélancolies de tous les jours qui passent, Nantes, Joca Seria, 2004, 70 p. 
 Le Cinéma de Singapour. Paradis perdu, doute existentiel, crise identitaire et mélancolie contemporaine, Paris, L'Harmattan, collection « Regards pluriels », 2004, 142 p. 
 Cinémas de la Méditerranée, cinémas de la mélancolie, Paris, L'Harmattan, collection « Regards pluriels », juillet 2002, 117 p.

Other publications 
 Five Ashore in Singapore - A European Spy Film, BiblioAsia, Singapore: National Library Board, vol.14, issue 03, October–December 2018, pp. 10–17.
 Chaplin in Bali, BiblioAsia, Singapore: National Library Board, vol.13, issue 01, April–June 2017, pp. 02–07.
 Gaston Méliès and His Lost Films of Singapore, BiblioAsia, Singapore: National Library Singapore, vol.12, issue 01, April–June 2016.
 The Revival of Singaporean Cinema 1995-2014, BiblioAsia, Singapore: National Library Singapore, vol.11, issue 01, April–June 2015. ISSN 0219-8126 (print). ISSN 1793-9968 (online).
 Cinemas of Southeast Asia, entry on Singapore, AsiExpo, April 2012. 
 « Remembering Henri Huet, the Young Veteran », catalogue of the exhibition Requiem, Singapore, Nanyang Academy of Fine Arts (NAFA), in partnership with Month of Photography Asia, July 2011, pp. 4–5. 
 Dictionnaire du cinéma asiatique, entries on Malaysian and Singaporean cinemas, Paris, Éditions Nouveau Monde, 2008 
 The Encyclopedia of Singapore, entries on Singaporean cinema, Singapore, EDM/Archipelago Press, 2006 
 Dictionnaire du cinéma, entries on African, Arab and Iranian cinemas, Paris, Larousse, 2001. 
 « Cimetières marins : les Méditerranées de Jean-Daniel Pollet », in Jeune, dure et pure ! Une histoire du cinéma d'avant-garde et expérimental en France, ed. by Nicole Brenez and Christian Lebrat, Paris, Cinémathèque française / Mazzotta, 2000, pp. 459. 
 « En attendant le vote des bêtes sauvages (Afrique 50 de René Vautier) », in Jeune, dure et pure ! Une histoire du cinéma d'avant-garde et expérimental en France, ed. by Nicole Brenez and Christian Lebrat, Paris, Cinémathèque française / Mazzotta, 2000, pp. 324–325. 
 « L'Indépendance cinématographique dans le champ du pouvoir. Une question éminemment politique », in Théorème, Paris, Presses universitaires de la Sorbonne Nouvelle, n°9, printemps 1998, pp. 39–48.
 « (In)dépendance des cinémas du Sud &/vs France », in Théorème, Paris, Presses universitaires de la Sorbonne Nouvelle, n°9, printemps 1998, p. 141–178

Production of books 
 The First Night Race. Photographs of the Singapore Grand Prix 2008, by Paul-Henri Cahier, Singapore, LookOutPress (an imprint of Phish Communications), 2009 
 Engaging Asia, catalogue of Month of Photography Asia 2009, Singapore, LookOutPress (an imprint of Phish Communications), 2009 
 Grand Prix. The F1 Legend through Photography, by Bernard and Paul-Henri Cahier, Singapore, LookOutPress (an imprint of Phish Communications), 2008

Films

Produced 
 Code Name Melville (2008)
 André S. Labarthe, From the Cat to the Hat (2011)
 Melville-Delon : d'honneur et de nuit (2011)
 Jean-Luc Godard / Disorder Exposed (2012)
 Edgar Morin, Chronicle of a Gaze (2014)

Directed 
 Pierre Schoendoerffer, the Sentinel of Memory (2011)
 The Cinematographic Voyage of Gaston Méliès to Tahiti (2014)
 Gaston Méliès and His Wandering Star Film Company (2015)
 Chaplin in Bali (2017)
 La Poche de Saint-Nazaire, une si longue occupation (2019)
 The Voyages of Matisse - Chasing Light (2020)
 The Capitol of Singapore (2020)

References

External links 
  Cinémas de la Méditerranée, cinémas de la mélancolie sur le site de L'Harmattan
  Code Name Melville on IMDB
  Notice de Sous le nom de Melville sur le Film documentaire
  Liste des collaborateurs de Positif sur le site web Art and Popular Culture
  Review of Singapore Cinema on the blog of the Singapore Film Society

French film critics
French film producers
French film directors
Living people
Lycée Henri-IV alumni
French male non-fiction writers
Year of birth missing (living people)